"Heroin" is a song by the Velvet Underground, released on their 1967 debut album The Velvet Underground & Nico. Written by Lou Reed in 1964, the song, which overtly depicts heroin use and abuse, is one of the band's most celebrated compositions. Critic Mark Deming of Allmusic writes, "While 'Heroin' hardly endorses drug use, it doesn't clearly condemn it, either, which made it all the more troubling in the eyes of many listeners."  In 2004, it was ranked at number 448 on Rolling Stones list of The 500 Greatest Songs of All Time, and was re-ranked at number 455 in 2010.

Writing and recording
In an interview with WLIR in 1972, Reed said he wrote the lyrics while working for a record company.

"Heroin" was among a three-song set to be re-recorded, in May 1966 at TTG Studios in Hollywood, before being included on the final release of The Velvet Underground & Nico (along with "I'm Waiting for the Man" and "Venus in Furs"). This recording of the song is the album's second longest track on the album at 7 minutes and 12 seconds; "European Son" is 30 seconds longer.

"Heroin" begins slowly with Reed's quiet, melodic guitar, Sterling Morrison's rhythm guitar and drum patterns by Maureen Tucker, soon joined by John Cale's droning electric viola. The tempo increases gradually, until a crescendo, punctuated by Cale's viola and the more punctuated guitar strumming of Reed and Morrison. Tucker's drumming becomes faster and louder. The song then slows to the original tempo, and repeats the same pattern before ending.

The song is based on D♭ and G♭ major chords. Like "Sister Ray", it features no bass guitar; Reed and Morrison use chords and arpeggios to create the song's trademark sound. Rolling Stone said "It doesn't take much to make a great song," alluding to the song's use of merely two chords.

Tucker stopped drumming for several seconds at the 5:17 mark, before picking up the beat again. She explains:

Personnel
 Lou Reed – lead vocals, lead guitar
 John Cale – electric viola
 Sterling Morrison – rhythm guitar
 Maureen Tucker – percussion

Alternative versions

Pickwick Records, May 1965
The earliest recorded version of "Heroin" was a solo demo by Lou Reed. This demo was recorded in May 1965 while he was working for Pickwick Records, subsequently mailed to himself, and rediscovered more than 50 years later.

Ludlow Street Loft, July 1965
Another version of "Heroin" was with Lou Reed, Sterling Morrison and John Cale at the band's Ludlow Street loft in July 1965. Unlike songs such as "I'm Waiting for the Man" and "Venus in Furs" which sound drastically different from their corresponding 1966 recordings on The Velvet Underground & Nico, the '65 version of "Heroin" is nearly identical to the album version in structure. On the recording, Reed performs the song on an acoustic guitar. This version of the song can be found on the 1995 compilation album, Peel Slowly and See.

Scepter Studios, April 1966
The original take of "Heroin" that was intended for release on The Velvet Underground & Nico was at Scepter Studios in New York City, April 1966. This version of the song features slightly different lyrics and a more contained, less chaotic performance. Overall, the tempo of the song is at a steadier, quicker pace. It is about a minute shorter.

One notable difference in the lyrics is Lou Reed's opening — he sings "I know just where I'm going" rather than "I don't know just where I'm going" as on the final album recording. Reed was known to do this during subsequent performances of the song as well.

The Velvet Underground and drugs
"Heroin" (along with songs like "I'm Waiting for the Man" which dealt with similar subject matter) tied the Velvet Underground with drug use in the media. Some critics declared the band were glorifying the use of drugs such as heroin. However, members of the band (Reed, in particular) frequently denied any claims that the song was advocating use of the drug. Reed's lyrics, such as they are on the majority of The Velvet Underground & Nico, were more meant to focus on providing an objective description of the topic without taking a moral stance. Critics were not the only ones who misunderstood the song's neutral tone; fans would sometimes approach the band members after a live performance and tell them they "shot up to 'Heroin'", a phenomenon that deeply disturbed Reed. As a result, Reed was somewhat hesitant to play the song with the band through much of the band's later career.

Billy Idol version

Billy Idol covered the song on his 1993 album Cyberpunk. Billy Idol's cover interpreted the song as a fast-tempo dance track, which made use of sampling and techno beats. It also included the lyric "Jesus died for somebody's sins / But not mine", from Patti Smith's introduction to "Gloria", used under license from Linda Music Corporation. Idol told Cash Box in 1993, "I was listening to some stripped-down rhythm tracks and started singing the lyrics [to "Heroin"] on top of it. It sounded like it really worked. Then I started tossing in the old Patti Smith line as a chorus. It really sounded heavy."

Idol mixed eleven versions of "Heroin", releasing them on various singles with some containing previous hits. Six computer-manipulated mixes were produced for the song's music video. One of these videos was later released on a video with his follow-up single Shock to the System.

Reception
Larry Flick, writing for Billboard, described Idol's version as a "clench-toothed reading of the Velvet Underground classic" with the use of Smith's "Gloria" adding a "spooky incantation". He added that while Idol's rock following "may grimace at his rave musings", the artist's "penchant for caustic sounds and frenetic rhythms makes this track ring remarkably true". Stephen Thomas Erlewine of AllMusic called it "one of the worst covers ever recorded" in his review of Cyberpunk. Further criticism came in April 2006 from Q Magazine who placed the Cyberpunk album in its list of Top 50 Worst Albums of all time, commenting that Idol's version of Heroin "sounded like it was recorded on a Casio keyboard" and that the album as a whole was "more Blake's 7 than Blade Runner".

Charts

Other cover versions
The song has been covered by several artists, including Mazzy Star, Human Drama, Echo & the Bunnymen, Roky Erickson, and Third Eye Blind.
Lou Reed later performed "Heroin" live in his glam rock style, featuring the guitarists Steve Hunter and Dick Wagner. The resulting thirteen-minute track is included on his live album Rock 'n' Roll Animal, released in 1974.
Pere Ubu performed "Heroin" live with Peter Laughner on vocals, a recording that was released on The Shape of Things.

References in popular culture
Denis Johnson's short story collection Jesus' Son, and the film based on it took its title from the lyrics of this song. 
In Irvine Welsh's novel Trainspotting, the central character Mark Renton describes playing the Rock 'n' Roll Animal version of 'Heroin' instead of the original as 'breaking the junkie's golden rule'.

References

External links
 "Heroin", on the Clipland database.
 "Heroin" (V.R. Heroin mix), Chrysalis Records, SingingFool.

The Velvet Underground songs
1966 songs
Experimental rock songs
Songs written by Lou Reed
Songs about drugs
Songs about heroin
1993 singles
Billy Idol songs